Yasuoka Dam  is a dam in the Nagano Prefecture, Japan, completed in 1935.

There have been rumours there heve been talks to demolish the dam, but these have not been confirmed.

References 

Dams in Nagano Prefecture
Dams completed in 1935
1935 establishments in Japan